Crip may refer to:

People
 Crip Toomey, American football and baseball player and coach 
 Henry "Crip" Heard (1923–1991), an African-American dancer

Science
 CRIP1, the human gene for Cysteine-rich protein 1
 CRIP2, the human gene for Cysteine-rich protein 2

Other uses
 Chicago, Rock Island and Pacific Railroad, United States
 Crip (disability term), reclaimed slang for cripple
Crip theory, a branch of disability studies
 CRIP (Clave de Registro e Identidad Personal), a registration and identification code used in Mexico 
 Crips, a street gang in Los Angeles 
 Crank Reference index Position (CRiP), an important measurement taken by crankshaft position sensors.